Edgar Lee Ford  (April 10, 1862 – June 8, 1931) was a professional baseball first baseman and shortstop. He played in the  American Association for the Richmond Virginians. He later managed in the minor leagues in 1912 and 1914.

External links

1862 births
1931 deaths
Major League Baseball first basemen
Baseball players from Richmond, Virginia
Richmond Virginians players
19th-century baseball players
Newark Domestics players
Richmond Virginians (minor league) players
Chattanooga Lookouts players
Minor league baseball managers